The John Baker Tapes are 2008 compilations of music and effects recorded by John Baker published in two volumes.  The first volume focuses on his work at the BBC Radiophonic Workshop while the second focuses on his freelance work.  A vinyl edition was also released with tracks selected from both volumes.

Volume 1: BBC Radiophonics

Track listing

Volume 2: Soundtracks, Library, Home Recordings, Electro Ads

Track listing

Vinyl version

Track listing

References

Bibliography

External links
Label information
 
 
 

BBC Radiophonic Workshop albums
2008 compilation albums
Trunk Records compilation albums